The Gay and Lesbian Archives of the Pacific Northwest (GLAPN) is an Oregon-based nonprofit dedicated to uncovering the history of sexual minorities in the Pacific Northwest. Founded in 1994, GLAPN works to collect, document, preserve and share historical data, artifacts and materials as and when they become available.

As described by Portland State University, which collaborates with GLAPN, "GLAPN members are involved in many activities that promote a greater awareness and understanding of our long history - including processing collections and doing independent research."  GLAPN's archives are located at the Oregon Historical Society.

GLAPN's research is featured in the media through, for example, a regular columns that features LGBT pioneers, scandals and issues, among other things. Its work is also part of some university collections. Its oral histories are available online, and its timelines and stories are often cited by media. GLAPN also puts on history shows that frequently feature queer leaders.

References

External links

 
 Gay and Lesbian Archives of the Pacific Northwest at Portland State University
 Gay & Lesbian Archives of the Pacific Northwest: LGBTQ History at The Oregon Encyclopedia

1994 establishments in Oregon
Archives in the United States
LGBT in Oregon
LGBT organizations in the United States
Organizations established in 1994